Carlton D'metrius Pearson (born March 19, 1953) is an American minister and gospel music artist. At one time, he was the pastor of the Higher Dimensions Evangelistic Center Incorporated, later named the Higher Dimensions Family Church, which was one of the largest churches in Tulsa, Oklahoma. During the 1990s, it grew to an average attendance of over 6,000. 

Due to his stated belief in universal reconciliation, Pearson rapidly began to lose his influence in ministry with the Joint College of African-American Pentecostal Bishops and was eventually declared a heretic by his peers in 2004.

Pearson has subsequently been the senior minister of Christ Universal Temple, a large New Thought congregation in Chicago, Illinois; head of a new Higher Dimensions fellowship in Chicago; and an affiliate minister at Tulsa's All Souls Unitarian Church.

Early career 
Pearson was born on March 19, 1953, in San Diego, California. He attended Oral Roberts University in Tulsa, where he was mentored by Oral Roberts, and sang with the World Action Singers, later becoming an associate evangelist with the Oral Roberts Evangelistic Association. He was licensed and ordained in the Church of God in Christ. 

In 1981, Pearson formed his own church, Higher Dimensions Evangelistic Center, which became one of the largest churches in Tulsa. Along with Dr. Frederick K. C. Price, he was at one time one of only two African American ministers to host a weekly national television preaching show, reaching hundreds of thousands to millions of people weekly, and has been credited as being one of the first black ministers to hold major conferences in arenas and stadiums across the country. During the 1990s, Pearson's church grew to an average weekly attendance of over 6,000. On the opening night of his annual AZUSA Conference in 1996, Pearson was ordained as a bishop, and then consecrated on the opening night of AZUSA '97. 

In 2000, Pearson campaigned for George W. Bush, and later he was invited to the White House. Pearson also had one of the most watched TV programs on the Trinity Broadcasting Network. Pearson was also the host of the AZUSA Conference in Tulsa. Pearson was also a traveling evangelist, holding two-day revivals across the continent. Pearson also gave many up-and-coming ministers and singers national exposure and a global audience, including T. D. Jakes, Joyce Meyer, and Donnie McClurkin. Pearson has also met and counseled with former presidents George H. W. Bush and Bill Clinton.

Pearson is also a gospel vocalist who has won two Stellar Awards, and he was nominated for a Dove Award.

The Gospel of Inclusion 

After watching a television program about the wretched conditions of people suffering and dying from the 1994 genocide in Rwanda, and considering the teachings of his church that non-Christians were going to Hell, Pearson believed he had received an epiphany from God. He stated publicly that he doubted the existence of Hell as a place of eternal torment. He said that hell is created on earth by human depravity and behavior.

In February 2002, Pearson lost a primary election for the office of mayor of Tulsa. By then Pearson had begun to call his doctrine—a variation on universal reconciliation—the Gospel of Inclusion and many in his congregation began to leave.

In March 2004, after hearing Pearson's argument for inclusion, the Joint College of African-American Pentecostal Bishops concluded that such teaching was heresy. Declared a heretic by his peers, Pearson rapidly began to lose his influence in the evangelical fundamentalist church. Membership at the Higher Dimensions Family Church fell below 1,000, and the church lost its building to foreclosure in January 2006. The church members began meeting at Trinity Episcopal Church on Sunday afternoons as the renamed New Dimensions Worship Center.

The Higher Dimensions Worship Center 
In November 2006, Pearson was accepted as a United Church of Christ minister.

In June 2008, the then renamed New Dimensions Worship Center moved its services to the All Souls Unitarian Church in Tulsa. On September 7, 2008, Pearson held his final service for the New Dimensions Worship Center, and it was absorbed into the All Souls Unitarian Church.

The Christ Universal Temple (Chicago) 
In May 2009, Pearson was named the interim minister of the Christ Universal Temple, a large New Thought congregation in Chicago, Illinois. On January 3, 2011, it was reported that he had left this position.

New Dimensions Chicago and return to Tulsa 
In 2014 Pearson returned to Tulsa to be with his ailing father who died two days after Pearson's 62nd birthday.  He began preaching at the 11 am service at All Souls Unitarian Church on the third Sunday of the month, while still traveling to Chicago to preach once a month at New Dimensions Chicago, the fellowship he founded there. Pearson also began holding a monthly discussion with a guest before a live audience at Tulsa's "My Studio" in May 2015. His first conversation was with Neale Donald Walsch, author of the mega-best-selling nine-book series, Conversations With God.

Media coverage 
 Pearson's life story was the subject of "Heretics", an episode of the Chicago Public Radio program This American Life that was first broadcast on December 16, 2005.
 Pearson's life story was telecast on the Dateline NBC program, To Hell and Back, first shown on August 13, 2006.
 Pearson was the subject of a Cable News Network story on June 24, 2007, that covered the changes in his teachings (including acceptance of LGBT people into his church) and the backlash against it.
 In March 2009, Pearson appeared on Nightline "Face Off" with Deepak Chopra, Mark Driscoll, and Annie Lobert to address the question "Does Satan Exist?"
 In September 2010, Pearson again appeared on CNN with anchor Kyra Phillips, discussing the widely publicized gay rumors regarding Bishop Eddie Long. Pearson was again criticized for his inclusive thinking by many Christian fundamentalists, for stating 
 In December 2010, Academy Award winner Mo'Nique invited Pearson to appear on her BET-TV late night talk show. Mo'Nique publicly suggested that she followed and supported Pearson and would "come to his church in Atlanta, if he had one and would have her."

Come Sunday 

In July 2010 it was announced that director Marc Forster would direct a feature film about Pearson's life, from a script by Marcus Hinchey based on This American Life'''s "Heretics" episode. In January 2017, Joshua Marston was reported to be directing the project as a film for Netflix, with Chiwetel Ejiofor cast to play Pearson, Condola Rashad as his wife Gina, and Martin Sheen as Oral Roberts. The film, entitled Come Sunday, premiered at the 2018 Sundance Film Festival and was released on Netflix on April 13, 2018.

 Personal life 
In September 1993, Pearson was married at age 40 to the former Gina Marie Gauthier (born December 13, 1961 in Lake Charles, LA). She is a life coach by profession. They have two children; a son, Julian D'metrius Pearson, born on July 9, 1994, in Tulsa, Oklahoma, and a daughter, Majestè Amour Pearson, born October 29, 1996, in Tulsa, Oklahoma.

On August 25, 2015, Gina Pearson filed for divorce from Carlton. On May 19, 2016, before the divorce was finalized, Mrs. Pearson dismissed her petition for divorce. The divorce was finalized on October 3, 2019.

 Books 
 The Gospel of Inclusion: Reaching Beyond Religious Fundamentalism to the True Love of God, 2007. Azusa Press/ Council Oak Books, .
 God Is Not a Christian, Nor a Jew, Muslim, Hindu… 2010 Atria Books/ Simon & Schuster, Inc. .

 References 

 External links 
 Carlton Pearson's website
 Pearson's life story, as told on This American Life, with numerous quotes from Pearson
 Carlton Pearson interview discussing his departure from Christ Universal Temple, Chicago Tonight'', WTTW, January 6, 2011.

American Pentecostals
American gospel singers
1953 births
Living people
Musicians from Tulsa, Oklahoma
Oral Roberts University alumni
United Church of Christ members
American bishops
American Christian universalists
American Christian pacifists
People from San Diego
20th-century Christian universalists
21st-century Christian universalists
Christian universalist clergy
Christian universalist theologians
20th-century American singers
21st-century American singers
Singers from California
Singers from Oklahoma
Candidates in the 2002 United States elections
Activists from California
20th-century American male singers
21st-century American male singers